The 22963 / 22964 Bandra Terminus - Bhavnagar Terminus Weekly Superfast Express is a Superfast Express train belonging to Indian Railways Western Zone that runs between  and  in India.From 18 December, 2022, it runs with highly refurbished LHB coaches.

Coaches
The 22963 / 64 Bandra Terminus - Bhavnagar Terminus Weekly Superfast Express has 2 AC 2-tier, 6 AC 3-tier, 8 Sleeper Class, 4 General Unreserved, 1 EOG & 1 SLR (Seating with Luggage Rake) coaches. It does not carry a pantry car coach.

As is customary with most train services in India, coach composition may be amended at the discretion of Indian Railways depending on demand.

Service

As the average speed of the train is above , as per railway rules, its fare includes a Superfast surcharge.

Route and halts

The important halts of the train are:

Schedule

Rake sharing
The train shares its rake with 12941/12942 Bhavnagar Terminus - Asansol Parasnath Superfast Express.

Traction
It is hauled by a Electric Loco Shed, Vadodara based WAP-7 for its entire journey.

References

Express trains in India
Transport in Bhavnagar
Rail transport in Gujarat
Rail transport in Maharashtra
Railway services introduced in 2014